Vitali Davidovich Milman (born 23 August 1939) is a mathematician specializing in analysis.  He is a professor at the Tel Aviv University. In the past he was a President of the Israel Mathematical Union and a member of the “Aliyah” committee of Tel Aviv University.

Work

Milman received his Ph.D. at Kharkiv State University in 1965 under the direction of Boris Levin.

In a 1971 paper, Milman gave a new proof of Dvoretzky's theorem, stating that every convex body in dimension N has a section of dimension d(N), with d(N) tending to infinity with N, that is arbitrarily close to being isometric to an ellipsoid. Milman's proof gives the optimal bound d(N) ≥ const log N. In this proof, Milman put forth the  concentration of measure phenomenon which has since found numerous applications.

Milman made important contributions to the study of Banach spaces of large (finite) dimension, which led to the development of asymptotic geometric analysis. His results in this field include Milman's reverse Brunn–Minkowski inequality and the quotient of subspace theorem.

Positions
He holds several positions including being the advisor to the Israel Ministry of Science on the immigration of scientists, and being a member of the European Mathematical Union.

He is on the editorial boards of several journals, including Geometric and Functional Analysis. He has published over 150 scientific publications, a monograph and eleven edited books. He has delivered lectures at Universities such as MIT, IAS Princeton, Berkeley, IHES Paris, Cambridge.

Awards and honors
Milman was an Invited Speaker of the International Congress of Mathematicians in 1986 in Berkeley and in 1998 in Berlin. He received the Landau Prize in Mathematics in 2002 and the EMET Prize in mathematics in 2007.

In 2012 he became a fellow of the American Mathematical Society.

Family
Mathematics runs in the Milman family. His father is the mathematician David Milman, who devised the Krein–Milman theorem. His brother is the mathematician Pierre Milman and his son is the young mathematician Emanuel Milman.

Selected works
.

Notes

External links 
 Vitali Milman's website

Ukrainian Jews
Soviet mathematicians
20th-century Israeli mathematicians
1939 births
Living people
Academic staff of Tel Aviv University
Fellows of the American Mathematical Society
National University of Kharkiv alumni
20th-century Ukrainian mathematicians